Se-tenant can mean one of two things:
Se-tenant (philately), two or more different designs or values of stamp printed together in the same sheet
Semi-detached house, also known as a se-tenant house, a form of terraced house in which only two properties are joined